The European Champion Clubs Cup is an athletics competition to the European junior athletics club that wins their national championships.

Organized by European Athletics Association, first edition was held in 1979. The 2011 held in Castellón, Spain.

Editions
For the first time, in 2011, an Italian team, Audacia Atletica Record Juniors, wins the cup in Women category.

See also
 European Athletics Association
 European Champion Clubs Cup (athletics)

References

External links
 European Athletics Association
 European Champion Clubs Cup for Junior - History
 European Champions Clubs Cup Track & Field Juniors: Winners & Records

Cup
Under-20 athletics competitions